The Harrogate–Church Fenton line was a railway line opened by the York and North Midland Railway between 1847 and 1848 linking Harrogate and Church Fenton.

History

The Harrogate–Church Fenton line is a former railway line in North Yorkshire, which ran from Harrogate to Church Fenton.  It was staked out by York and North Midland Railway in September 1845 and the line opened from Church Fenton to Spofforth on 10 August 1847. The line from Spofforth and Harrogate was opened on 20 July 1848 after the major engineering structures on the line (the 31-arch,  Crimple Viaduct and the  Prospect Tunnel) were completed.

A short lived station named Crimple, located on the junction with the Leeds–Harrogate line immediately east of the viaduct, only appeared in timetables from 1867 to 1869 and has been demolished. 

In 1901, a new south-to-west curve was built at Wetherby to enable trains from Harrogate to Wetherby to use the Cross Gates–Wetherby line without reversal. Following this, a new passenger station serving Wetherby was opened on the Cross Gates–Wetherby line and the Wetherby station on the Harrogate–Church Fenton line became goods-only.

In April 1942, the Thorp Arch circular railway was opened to serve Thorp Arch Royal Ordnance Factory, which produced munitions. Trains accessed this single-track railway from the Harrogate–Church Fenton line near Thorp Arch station. The ROF at Thorp Arch closed in 1958 and the circular railway was closed and lifted in the same year.

Stutton station closed to passengers on 1 July 1905 but remained open for goods until the end of July 1964.

The whole of the line was closed to passengers in January 1964 (one of the first of Dr Beeching's casualties) and closed entirely in 1966.

Harrogate Brunswick
The original terminus of the line was at Harrogate Brunswick. This left the present line just north of Hornbeam Park railway station and headed westwards through a  tunnel (known as Brunswick Tunnel) and exited at the site of the Leeds Road and Park Drive Roundabout. It then went through a cutting before terminating at Brunswick Station.

The railway was made to go through a tunnel rather than across The Stray as the townsfolk were worried about the railway lowering the aristocratic tones of the spa town. The station was in operation from 1848-1862 and was replaced when the North Eastern Railway built a station on the site of what is the modern day Harrogate railway station.

During the Second World War, Brunswick Tunnel was used as an air raid shelter.

The line today
A very short stretch of the original line is still in use as part of the Harrogate line with services to and from Leeds. Whilst the southern portal of the tunnel is still visible, all traces of the station site at Brunswick have been removed.

In 1992, a  stretch of the former trackbed between Spofforth and Wetherby was converted into a cycle track. By 2003, the path had been extended to Thorp Arch and also included the former triangle of lines at Wetherby to link in with other cycle paths to Linton and Collingham on the West Yorkshire Cycle Route.

In January 2019, Campaign for Better Transport released a report identifying the line which was listed as Priority 2 for reopening. Priority 2 is for those lines which require further development or a change in circumstances (such as housing developments).

References

Bibliography

Closed railway lines in Yorkshire and the Humber
Rail trails in England